In algebraic topology, a branch of mathematics, Snaith's theorem, introduced by Victor Snaith, identifies the complex K-theory spectrum with the localization of the suspension spectrum of  away from the Bott element.

References 
For a proof, see http://people.fas.harvard.edu/~amathew/snaith.pdf
Victor Snaith, Algebraic Cobordism and K-theory, Mem. Amer. Math. Soc. no 221 (1979)

External links 

Theorems in algebraic topology
K-theory